Guilliers is a commune in the Morbihan department of Brittany in north-western France. Inhabitants of Guilliers are called in French Guilliérois.

Geography

Historically, Guiiliers belongs to Porhoët and Upper Brittany.

Map

See also
Communes of the Morbihan department

References

External links
 Mayors of Morbihan Association 

Communes of Morbihan